Queen’s Chambers is a Grade II listed building on Long Row and King Street in Nottingham.

History
It was constructed in 1897 to the designs of local architect Fothergill Watson for Edward Skipwith, a wine merchant, in the Tudorbeathan Gothic style. Edward Skipwith was a long standing merchant operating from premises on Long Row, and he rebuilt this building as he retired, possibly as a retirement investment. It comprised 4 shops with offices above.

In 1993 the building underwent a £500,000 refurbishment lasting six months by Thomas Fish. This project won the 1993 Lord Mayor’s Urban Design Award.

References

Grade II* listed buildings in Nottinghamshire
Buildings and structures completed in 1897